Alteribacillus bidgolensis is a Gram-positive, moderately halophilic and non-motile bacterium from the genus of Alteribacillus which has been isolated from water from the Aran-Bidgol lake in Iran.

References

External links
Type strain of Alteribacillus bidgolensis at BacDive -  the Bacterial Diversity Metadatabase

Bacillaceae
Bacteria described in 2012